Senga is a rural locality (a selo) in Sidorovskoye Rural Settlement, Gryazovetsky District, Vologda Oblast, Russia. The population was 74 as of 2002.

Geography 
Senga is located 34 km east of Gryazovets (the district's administrative centre) by road. Lukyanovo is the nearest rural locality.

References 

Rural localities in Gryazovetsky District